Eduard Sergeyevich Bogdanov (born 8 May 1994) is a Russian football player.

Club career
He made his debut in the Russian Second Division for FC Baikal Irkutsk on 15 July 2012 in a game against FC Sakhalin Yuzhno-Sakhalinsk. He made his Russian Football National League debut for Baikal on 28 September 2015 in a game against FC Sibir Novosibirsk.

References

External links
 
 
 Career summary by sportbox.ru
 Eduard Bogdanov at CFU

1994 births
Sportspeople from Irkutsk
Living people
Russian footballers
Association football midfielders
FC Baikal Irkutsk players
FC Sibir Novosibirsk players